In mathematics, a square-free integer (or squarefree integer) is an integer which is divisible by no square number other than 1. That is, its prime factorization has exactly one factor for each prime that appears in it. The smallest positive square-free numbers are

Square-free factorization
Every positive integer  can be factored in a unique way as

where the  different from one are square-free integers that are pairwise coprime.

To construct the square-free factorization, let
 
Then the factors of the square-free factorization are defined as 

An integer is square-free if and only if  for all . An integer greater than one is the th power of another integer if and only if  is a divisor of all  such that 

The use of the square-free factorization of integers is limited by the fact that its computation is as difficult as the computation of the prime factorization. More precisely every known algorithm for computing a square-free factorization computes also the prime factorization. This is a notable difference with the case of polynomials for which the same definitions can be given, but, in this case, the square-free factorization is not only easier to compute than the complete factorization, but it is the first step of all standard factorization algorithms.

Square-free factors of integers
An integer is square-free if and only if it is equal to its radical.

Every positive integer  can be represented in a unique way as the product of a powerful number (that is an integer such that is divisible by the square of every prime factor) and a square-free integer, which are coprime.

The square-free part of an integer may be smaller than the largest square-free divisor, which is 

Any arbitrary positive integer  can be represented in a unique way as the product of a square and a square-free integer:

In summary, there are three square-free factors that are naturally associated to every integer: the square-free part, the above factor , and the largest square-free factor. Each is a factor of the next one. All are easily deduced from the prime factorization or the square-free factorization: if

The square-free factor such the quotient is a square is 

and the largest square-free factor is 

No algorithm is known for computing any of these square-free factors which is faster than computing the complete prime factorization. In particular, there is no known polynomial-time algorithm for computing the square-free part of an integer, or even for determining whether an integer is square-free.  In contrast, polynomial-time algorithms are known for primality testing. This is a major difference between the arithmetic of the integers, and the arithmetic of the univariate polynomials, as polynomial-time algorithms are known for square-free factorization of polynomials (in short, the largest square-free factor of a polynomial is its quotient by the greatest common divisor of the polynomial and its formal derivative).

Equivalent characterizations
An immediate result of this definition is that all prime numbers are square-free.

A positive integer  is square-free if and only if all abelian groups of order  are isomorphic, which is the case if and only if any such group is cyclic. This follows from the classification of finitely generated abelian groups.

A integer  is square-free if and only if the factor ring  (see modular arithmetic) is a product of fields. This follows from the Chinese remainder theorem and the fact that a ring of the form  is a field if and only if  is prime.

For every positive integer , the set of all positive divisors of  becomes a partially ordered set if we use divisibility as the order relation. This partially ordered set is always a distributive lattice. It is a Boolean algebra if and only if  is square-free.

A positive integer  is square-free if and only if , where  denotes the Möbius function.

Dirichlet series
The absolute value of the Möbius function is the indicator function for the square-free integers – that is,  is equal to 1 if  is square-free, and 0 if it is not.  The Dirichlet series of this indicator function is

where  is the Riemann zeta function.  This follows from the Euler product

where the products are taken over the prime numbers.

Distribution
Let Q(x) denote the number of square-free integers between 1 and x ( shifting index by 1). For large n, 3/4 of the positive integers less than n are not divisible by 4, 8/9 of these numbers are not divisible by 9, and so on. Because these ratios satisfy the multiplicative property (this follows from Chinese remainder theorem), we obtain the approximation:

This argument can be made rigorous for getting the estimate (using big O notation)

Sketch of a proof: the above characterization gives

By exploiting the largest known zero-free region of the Riemann zeta function Arnold Walfisz improved the approximation to

for some positive constant .

Under the Riemann hypothesis, the error term can be reduced to

Recently (2015) the error term has been further reduced to

The asymptotic/natural density of square-free numbers is therefore

Therefore over 3/5 of the integers are square-free.

Likewise, if Q(x,n) denotes the number of n-free integers (e.g. 3-free integers being cube-free integers) between 1 and x, one can show

Since a multiple of 4 must have a square factor 4=22, it cannot occur that four consecutive integers are all square-free. On the other hand, there exist infinitely many integers n for which 4n +1, 4n +2, 4n +3 are all square-free. Otherwise, observing that 4n and at least one of 4n +1, 4n +2, 4n +3 among four could be non-square-free for sufficiently large n, half of all positive integers minus finitely many must be non-square-free and therefore
 for some constant C,

There exist sequences of consecutive non-square-free integers of arbitrary length.  Indeed, if n satisfies a simultaneous congruence

for distinct primes , then each  is divisible by pi 2. Moreover, an elementary argument allows us to replace  by  The ABC conjecture would allow .

Table of Q(x), x, and R(x)   

The table shows how   and  compare at powers of 10.

{| class="wikitable" style="text-align: right"
! 
! 
! 
!
|-
| 10
| 7
| 6.1
| 0.9
|-
| 102
| 61
| 60.8
| 0.2
|-
| 103
| 608
| 607.9
| 0.1
|-
| 104
| 6,083
| 6,079.3
| 3.7
|-
| 105
| 60,794
| 60,792.7
| 1.3
|-
| 106
| 607,926
| 607,927.1
| 
|-
| 107
| 6,079,291
| 6,079,271.0
| 20.0
|-
| 108
| 60,792,694
| 60,792,710.2
| 
|-
| 109
| 607,927,124
| 607,927,101.9
| 22.1
|-
| 1010
| 6,079,270,942
|  6,079,271,018.5
| 
|-
| 1011
| 60,792,710,280
| 60,792,710,185.4
| 94.6
|-
| 1012
| 607,927,102,274
|  607,927,101,854.0
| 420.0
|-
| 1013
| 6,079,271,018,294
| 6,079,271,018,540.3
| 
|-
| 1014
| 60,792,710,185,947
| 60,792,710,185,402.7
| 544.3
|-
| 1015
| 607,927,101,854,103
| 607,927,101,854,027.0
| 76.0
|-
|}
 changes its sign infinitely often as  tends to infinity.

Encoding as binary numbers
If we represent a square-free number as the infinite product

then we may take those  and use them as bits in a binary number with the encoding

The square-free number 42 has factorization , or as an infinite product   Thus the number 42 may be encoded as the binary sequence ...001011 or 11 decimal. (The binary digits are reversed from the ordering in the infinite product.)

Since the prime factorization of every number is unique, so also is every binary encoding of the square-free integers.

The converse is also true. Since every positive integer has a unique binary representation it is possible to reverse this encoding so that they may be decoded into a unique square-free integer.

Again, for example, if we begin with the number 42, this time as simply a positive integer, we have its binary representation 101010. This decodes to 

Thus binary encoding of squarefree numbers describes a bijection between the nonnegative integers and the set of positive squarefree integers.

(See sequences A019565, A048672 and A064273 in the OEIS.)

Erdős squarefree conjecture
The central binomial coefficient

 

is never squarefree for n > 4. This was proven in 1985 for all sufficiently large integers by András Sárközy, and for all integers > 4 in 1996 by Olivier Ramaré and Andrew Granville.

Squarefree core
Let us call "t-free" a positive integer that has no t-th power in its divisors. In particular, the 2-free integers are the square-free integers.

The multiplicative function  maps every positive integer n to the quotient of n by its largest divisor that is a t-th power. That is, 
 

The integer  is t-free, and every t-free integer is mapped to itself by the function 

The Dirichlet generating function of the sequence   is
 .

Notes

References 

 
 

Number theory
Integer sequences